John Leadley Dagg (1794–1884), born in Loudoun County, Virginia was an American Baptist theologian.

Biography  
Dagg had a limited education, was near-blind, and physically disabled. He converted to Christianity at age 15 and served briefly in the War of 1812. Dagg was baptized in 1812 then studied medicine for three years. He was ordained as a minister in November 1817 and eventually served as the past of the Fifth Baptist Church in Philadelphia for nine years. He then moved to Tuscaloosa, Alabama and served as the president of the Alabama Female Athenaeum for eight years. Dagg left Tuscaloosa in January 1844 to become president of Mercer University. He served as president of Mercer until 1854, when his failing health forced him to retire. After retirement, Dagg authored four books. The first, Manual of Theology, was written in 1857 and was the first systematic theology written by a Baptist in America. His additional books included Treatise on Church Order (1858), Elements of Moral Science (1859), and Evidences of Christianity (1869). Dagg moved to Alabama to live near his daughter, where he died in Hayneville in 1884.

References

External links 
 Biographical Sketch at Founders.org
 Biographical Sketch by Georgia Encyclopedia
 John L. Dagg by Gilson Santos
 The Elements of Moral Science by John L. Dagg
 Manual of Theology by John L. Dagg
 A Treatise on Church Order by John L. Dagg
 Proclamation of Peace by John L. Dagg (1862)

1794 births
1884 deaths
Dagg, John L.
Dagg, John L.
Dagg, John L.
Presidents of Mercer University
American Baptist theologians
19th-century American clergy